Beryllium borohydride is an inorganic compound with the chemical formula Be(BH4)2.

Preparation
Beryllium borohydride is formed by the reaction of beryllium hydride with diborane in an ether solution.

It can also be formed by the reaction of beryllium chloride and lithium borohydride in a sealed tube at 120 °C:

Structure
The crystal structure is made up of a helical polymer of BH4Be and BH4 structure units. The borohydride ions, adopt a tetrahedral geometry. Beryllium is 6-coordinate and adopts a distorted trigonal prismatic geometry.

Application
The purest beryllium hydride is obtained by the reaction of triphenylphosphine, PPh3, with beryllium borohydride, Be(BH4)2 at 180 °C:

Be(BH4)2 + 2 PPh3 → 2 Ph3PBH3 + BeH2

References

Beryllium compounds
Borohydrides